Targalla is a genus of moths of the family Euteliidae. The genus was erected by Francis Walker in 1858.

Species
Targalla albiceps (Hampson, 1894) Indian subregion, Myanmar, Taiwan, Peninsular Malaysia, Borneo
Targalla alboquadrata Holloway, 1985 Borne, western Sulawesi
Targalla apicifascia (Hampson, 1894) Oriental tropics, Sundaland, New Guinea, Solomons
Targalla atripars (Hampson, 1912) Sundaland, Solomons
Targalla barbara (Robinson, 1975) Fiji
Targalla bifacies (Walker, 1858) Sri Lanka
Targalla carnea Warren, 1914 Rajasthan
Targalla delatrix (Guenée, 1852) Indo-Australian tropics, Fiji, Rapa, Society Islands
Targalla duplicilinea (Walker, 1862) Oriental tropics to Sundaland, Philippines, Sulawesi
Targalla eriopoides (Roepke, 1938) Sulawesi
Targalla infida Walker, [1858] Myanmar, Laos, northern Vietnam, Borneo, Philippines, Sulawesi, New Guinea, Australia
Targalla ludatrix (Walker, 1858)
Targalla palliatrix (Guenée, 1852) India, Thailand, Peninsular Malaysia, Taiwan, Sundaland, Fiji, Smaoa
Targalla pantarcha (Turner, 1922) northern Queensland, Philippines, Sulawesi, New Guinea
Targalla plumbea (Walker, 1865) Queensland
Targalla purpureonigra (Bethune-Baker, 1906) New Guinea
Targalla repleta (Walker, 1865)
Targalla scelerata (Holland, 1900) Borneo, Philippines, Sulawesi, New Guinea, Queensland, Solomons
Targalla silvicola Watabiki & Yoshimatsu, 2014 northern Vietnam, Laos, China (Guangdong, Guangxi, Hong Kong), Taiwan, Japan
Targalla subocellata (Walker, [1863]) north-eastern Himalayas, Sundaland, Philippines, Sulawesi, southern Moluccas, New Guinea, Queensland
Targalla suffundens (Walker, [1863]) Indo-Australian tropics to Queensland
Targalla sugii Holloway, 1985 Sikkim, Cherrapunji, Nepal, Thailan, northern Vietnam
Targalla transversa (Candéze, 1927) Vietnam, Borneo, New Guinea, Bismarcks

References

Euteliinae